= La Juventud Imparcial =

- Type: Fortnightly
- Editor: Mariano C. Reynolds
- Founded: October 14, 1875
- Ceased publication: 1876
- Language: Spanish language
- Headquarters: Sucre
- OCLC number: 228656059

La Juventud Imparcial ("The Impartial Youth") was a fortnightly newspaper published from Sucre, Bolivia 1875–1876. The first issue of the newspaper was published on October 14, 1875.

La Juventud Impercial had a format of 26 centimetres. The editor of the newspaper was Mariano C. Reynolds. La Juventud Imparcial was printed at the printing press of La Libertad.
